Jeremy Neville Marchant  (formerly Marchant Forde; born 6 Jan 1966, R.A.F. Akrotiri, Cyprus) is an English/American biologist and research animal scientist at the United States Department of Agriculture – Agricultural Research Service's Livestock Behavior Research Unit, based in West Lafayette, Indiana. He is also a past president of the International Society for Applied Ethology.

Biography

Jeremy Marchant attended Woodbridge School and subsequently the University of Bristol and St. Catharine's College, Cambridge. He received his BSc degree in biochemistry and Ph.D. degree in applied animal behaviour from Cambridge University, supervised by Prof. Donald Broom. During his time as a graduate student, he was a keen sportsman, representing Cambridge in the 1992 and 1993 Rugby League Varsity Matches, winning 2 Half Blues and being elected to the Hawks' Club. In 1996 he received a Churchill Fellowship which enabled him to spend 3 months visiting research centers throughout Northern Europe, collating research on alternatives to the farrowing crate, and influencing his work on causes of piglet mortality.

Previous academic positions include research associate at the University of Cambridge and senior research fellow at the University of Lincoln. Previous academic roles include honorary treasurer of the International Society for Applied Ethology and member of program committees for the American Society of Animal Science and British Society of Animal Science. He was chair of the organizing committee for the 45th Congress of the International Society for Applied Ethology held in Indianapolis in 2011. He has served on the editorial board for the Journal of Animal Science and as a section editor for Livestock Science. He was an inaugural specialty chief editor for Frontiers in Veterinary Science, with responsibility for the Animal Behavior & Welfare specialty section.

His early work on the effects of housing systems on the welfare of pregnant sows, specifically on cardiovascular health, bone strength and posture-changing behavior, contributed to the body of evidence that led, eventually, to major changes in animal welfare and the way these animals are kept in many parts of the world, beginning with the European Union and spreading to North America and Oceania. He was also the first animal welfare scientist to publish a study using heart rate variability as a welfare indicator.

He is a cousin of the cricketer Michael Peck.

Awards 
 1996: Travelling Fellowship: Winston Churchill Memorial Trusts
 1999: Distinguished Junior Scholar: Peter Wall Institute for Advanced Studies, University of British Columbia.
 2002–2016: 14 Certificates of Merit: US Department of Agriculture

Selected works 

Jeremy Marchant has over 250 refereed scientific publications, attracting over 5500 citations. His h-index is 40.

 The Welfare of Pigs (2009)
 The Encyclopedia of Applied Animal Behaviour and Welfare, with Daniel S. Mills, Paul McGreevy, David Morton, Christine Nicol, Clive Phillips, Peter Sandoe and Ronald Swaisgood (2010)
 Proceedings of the 45th Congress of the International Society for Applied Ethology, with Edmond Pajor (2011)

References

External links 
 USDA-ARS, LBRU
 International Society for Applied Ethology
 45th Congress of the ISAE, 2011

1966 births
Alumni of St Catharine's College, Cambridge
British animal welfare scholars
British animal welfare workers
English biologists
Ethologists
Fellows of the Royal Society of Biology
Living people
People educated at Woodbridge School